Lima Puluh Kota Regency (meaning fifty towns in the Minangkabau language) is a regency (kabupaten) of West Sumatra province, Indonesia. It has an area of 3,354.53 km2 and had a population of 348,249 at the 2010 census and 383,525 at the 2020 census. The regency seat is the town of Sarilamak.

Administration 
Lima Puluh Kota Regency is divided into thirteen districts (kecamatan), listed below with their areas and their populations at the 2010 census and the 2020 census.

Notes: (a) meaning grassy swamp in the Minangkabau language;Payakumbuh District is not to be confused with Payakumbuh city, which is an enclave within the regency but no longer administratively part of it.
(b) meaning row of hills in the Minangkabau language.
(c) meaning golden mountain in the Minangkabau language.

Harau Canyon
Harau Canyon is called as Indonesian Yosemite. There are 4 waterfalls here with heights of among 50–90 metres. The cliffs are around 80 to 300 metres and (rope) climbing guides are available.

Butterfly Park
Since 1 January 2012, Aka Barayun Butterfly Park near Harau Canyon has opened for free. Butterfly breeding cages are still in preparation and also some animals as mini zoo.

Kelok Sembilan Bridge 

Kelok Sembilan Bridge which connects West Sumatra Province and Riau Province at kilometre 143-148 was officially opened on 31 October 2013. Kelok Sembilan Bridge is also called as Kelok Sembilan Overpass, because it is over the old Kelok 44.
The first stage of the bridge is 720 metres with a 4 kilometres access road, the second stage is 250 metres bridge with a 1 kilometre access road. The bridge is predicted to save vehicles and passengers costs of up to Rp134.5 billion per year. The bridge cost itself was Rp550 billion ($49.5 million).

References

External links 

  Official website

Regencies of West Sumatra